The Lower Goulburn National Park is a national park located in the Goulburn Valley district of Victoria, Australia. The  linear national park protects the lower Goulburn River from Shepparton to its river mouth near Echuca where it forms confluence with the Murray River.

The park is renowned for its Eucalyptus camaldulensis (River Red Gums) that line much of the course of the river and the national park.

See also

 Protected areas of Victoria (Australia)

References

External links

National parks of Victoria (Australia)
Protected areas established in 2010
2010 establishments in Australia